Jean Drèze (born 1959) is a Belgian-born Indian welfare economist, social scientist and activist. He has worked on several developmental issues facing India like social welfare and gender inequality.

His co-authors include Nobel laureate in economics Amartya Sen, with whom he has written on famine, Nicholas Stern, with whom he has written on policy reform when market prices are distorted, and Nobel laureate in economics Angus Deaton. He is currently an honorary professor at the Delhi School of Economics, visiting professor at the Department of Economics, Ranchi University, and also the member of Economic Advisory Council to the Chief Minister of Tamil Nadu headed by the Nobel laureate Esther Duflo. He was a member of the National Advisory Council of India in both first and second term, but only for a year each time.

Early life
Jean Drèze was born on 22 January 1959 in the ancient town of Leuven as the son of Jacques Drèze, (founder of the Center for Operations Research and Econometrics at the Université catholique de Louvain). His brother, Xavier Drèze, is a marketing and consumer research scholar.

He studied mathematical economics at the University of Essex in the 1980s and did his PhD (theoretical economics of cost-benefit analysis) at the Indian Statistical Institute, New Delhi.

He has lived in India since 1979 and became an Indian citizen in 2002.

Personal life
He was based in Delhi (1993 to 2002) and in Allahabad (2002 to 2014). He currently lives in Ranchi.

Career
Jean Drèze taught at the London School of Economics in the 1980s, his only full-time post, and at the Delhi School of Economics, and had been Visiting Professor at the G.B. Pant Social Science Institute, Allahabad. Presently, he is an Honorary Chair Professor of the "Planning and Development Unit" created by the Planning Commission, Government of India, in the Department of Economics, University of Allahabad, India. He has made wide-ranging contributions to development economics and public economics, with special reference to India.

He has worked on many issues relating to development economics including hunger, famine, education, gender inequality, childcare, school feeding, employment guarantee etc. His works combine standard economic methods (such as his articles relating to poverty in India) and tools that are used more commonly by anthropologists (such as his work on the village of Palanpur, Moradabad District, Uttar Pradesh, India with Nicholas Stern, Peter Lanjouw and others, which included him living for a period in village under the same conditions as local people, farming a plot of land and keeping animals as recounted with Naresh Sharma in the article "Sharecropping in a North Indian Village", Journal of Development Studies, Oct. 1996). The combination of extensive field work and qualitative analysis of everyday life and poverty, along with quantitative work makes his work distinctive in the field of economics. He uniquely brings to the table his extensive fieldwork with analytical skills.

PROBE Report
A key work widely cited that Dreze worked on as part of a small team was the primary education study of key states in northern India typically referred to by its short name, The PROBE Report, or The Public Report on Basic Education (1999). It remains a key reference due to the lack of similarly comprehensive studies using grassroots development specialists.

Social activism
Dreze is well known for his commitment to social justice, both in India and internationally. During and after his PhD in India, he adopted a lifestyle of voluntary simplicity. While in the LSE, he frequently slept rough and lived with homeless squatters, helping to start a squatters movement in 1988 that opened buildings to the homeless and defied eviction. He wrote a short book about this movement and the life of the homeless in London, called No. 1 Clapham Road: the diary of a squat. Dreze is known for refusing luxury and, while doing fieldwork, still lives and works in the same conditions as his respondents. In Delhi he and his wife Bela Bhatia had a one-room house in a jhuggi.

Apart from academic work he has been actively involved in many social movements including the peace movement, the Right to Information campaign that led to the Right to Information Act in India, the Right to Food campaign in India, among others.

During the 1990–1991 Iraq War, he joined a peace camp stationed on the Iraq-Saudi border. His 1992 article with Haris Gazdar, "Hunger and Poverty in Iraq, 1991", was one of the first assessments of Iraq's economy after the Gulf war, and an early warning about the potential human costs of the Iraq sanctions. Another book that came out of Iraq is War and Peace in the Gulf, edited by Bela Bhatia, Jean Dreze and Kathy Kelly.

Publications
Books
 Drèze J. and Sen, A.K. 1989. Hunger and Public Action. Oxford University Press.
 (as Jean Delarue) 1990. No.1 Clapham Road: The diary of a squat. Peaceprint.
 Drèze J. and Sen, A. (eds.). 1991. The Political Economy of Hunger. Three volumes. Oxford University Press.
 Ahmad E, Drèze J, Hills J, Sen A K (eds.) 1991. Social Security in Developing Countries. Oxford: Clarendon Press.
 Drèze J. and Sen, A. 1995. The political Economy of Hunger: selected essays. Clarendon Press. (abridged)
 Drèze J. and Sen, A.K. 1995. India: Economic Development and Social Opportunity. Oxford University Press.
 Dreze, Jean and Amartya Sen, (eds), 1997. Indian Development: Selected Regional Perspectives. New Delhi: Oxford University Press.
 Drèze J., M. Samson and S. Singh. 1997. The Dam and the Nation: Displacement and Resettlement in the Narmada Valley. Delhi: Oxford University Press. .
 A. De and J Drèze. 1999. Public Report on Basic Education in India. The PROBE report. Oxford University Press. 
 Drèze J. (ed.) 1999. The Economics of Famine. International Library of Critical Writings in Economics. London: Edward Elgar Publishing.
 Bhatia B, J. Drèze & K. Kelly. 2001. War and Peace in the Gulf: Testimonies of the Gulf Peace Team. London: Spokesman Books. [published on the tenth anniversary of the Team's attempt to stop the Gulf War through non-violent occupation].
 Drèze J. and Sen, A.K. 2002. India: Development and Participation. Oxford University Press.
 Drèze J. and Sen, A.K. 2013 An Uncertain Glory, India and Its Contradictions. Penguin.
 Drèze J., 2017 Sense And Solidarity – Jholawala Economics for Everyone. Permanent Black. 

Articles

 Dreze, Jean and Haris Gazdar, 1997. "Uttar Pradesh: the Burden of Inertia", in Jean Dreze and Amartya Sen, (eds) Indian Development: Selected Regional Perspectives, New Delhi: Oxford University Press.
 Drèze, J. 1990. Famine Prevention in India. In Drèze J. and Sen, A. (eds.) The Political Economy of Hunger. vol 2. Oxford University Press.
 Stern, N. and Drèze J. 1991. Policy Reform, Shadow Prices and Market Prices. Journal of Public Economics.
 Drèze J., 1991. Public Action for Social Security: Foundations and Strategy. In Ahmad E, Drèze J, Hills J, Sen A K (eds.). Social Security in Developing Countries. Clarendon Press, Oxford.
 Drèze J. and H. Gazdar. 1992. Hunger and Poverty in Iraq, 1991. World Development.
 Drèze J., M. Murthi and A-C. Guio. 1995. Mortality, Fertility and Gender Bias in India. Population and Development Review.
 Dreze, Jean and Naresh Sharma, 1996, "Sharecropping in a North Indian Village", Journal of Development Studies, 33(1):1–40.
 Drèze J. and P.V. Srinivasan. 1997. Widowhood and Poverty in Rural India. Journal of Development Economics.
 Drèze J. and Sen, A.K. (eds.) 1997. Indian Development: Selected Regional Perspectives. Delhi: Oxford University Press.
 Dreze, Jean and Naresh Sharma, "Palanpur: Population, Society Economy", chapter 1 in Peter Lanjouw and Nicholas Stern, eds., Economic Development in Palanpur over Five Decades, 1998. Oxford: Clarendon Press.
 Dreze, Jean, Peter Lanjouw and Naresh Sharma. 1998. "Economic Development in Palanpur, 1957–93", chapter 2 in Peter Lanjouw and Nicholas Stern, eds., Economic Development in Palanpur over Five Decades. Oxford: Clarendon Press.
 Dreze, Jean and Naresh Sharam, "Tenancy", chapter 8 in Peter Lanjouw and Nicholas Stern, eds., Economic Development in Palanpur over Five Decades, 1998. Oxford: Clarendon Press.
 Dreze, Jean, Peter Lanjouw and Naresh Sharma, "Credit", chapter 9 in Peter Lanjouw and Nicholas Stern, eds., Economic Development in Palanpur over Five Decades, 1998. Oxford: Clarendon Press.
  Baland, J-M. Drèze J. and L. Leruth. 1999. Daily Wages and Piece Rates in Agrarian Economies. Journal of Development Economics.
 Drèze J. and R. Khera. 2000. Crime, Gender and Society in India. Population and Development Review.
 Drèze J. and G.G. Kingdon. 2001. . Review of Development Economics 5(1),1–24.
 Drèze J. 2001. Fertility, Education and Development: Evidence from India. Population and Development Review.
 Dreze, Jean "Patterns of Literacy and their Social Context", (originally written 199?), in Veena Das (ed.), 2004, Oxford Handbook of Indian Sociology, New Delhi: Oxford University Press.
 Dreze, Jean, 2002, "On Research and Action", Economic and Political Weekly, 2, 37 March (9). New Delhi.
 Deaton A. and Drèze J. 2002. Poverty and Inequality in India: A Reexamination. Economic and Political Weekly, 7 September. 3729–3748.
 Drèze J. 2003. Food Security and the Right to Food. In S. Mahendra Dev, K.P. Kannan and N. Ramachandran (eds). Toward a Food Secure India. New Delhi: Institute for Human Development.
 Drèze, Jean and Aparajita Goyal. 2003. Future of Mid-Day Meals. Economic and Political Weekly, 1 November.
 Drèze, Jean 2004. Democracy and the Right to Food. Economic and Political Weekly. 1723–1731.
 Deaton, Angus and Dreze, J. 2008. Nutrition in India: Facts and Interpretations'''
 Drèze, Jean Democracy and Power: The Delhi Lectures'', Introduction by Jean Dreze, Democracy and Power, Introduction
 Drèze, Jean, and Khera, Reetika. 2017. Recent Social Security Initiatives in India World Development.

See also
 National Advisory Council
 National Rural Employment Guarantee Act (NREGA)

References

External links

 Jean Drèze on TheHindu.com
 Interview on India Together
 Future of Mid-Day Meals.
 Focus On Children Under Six, FOCUS Report

Living people
1959 births
Belgian economists
Indian economists
Right to Information activists
Indian Statistical Institute alumni
People from Leuven
People who lost Belgian citizenship
Belgian emigrants to India
Indian people of Belgian descent
Naturalised citizens of India
Members of National Advisory Council, India
Alumni of the University of Essex
People from Ranchi
Scientists from Jharkhand
20th-century squatters
20th-century Indian economists
20th-century Belgian economists